The Mesa Solar Sox are a baseball team that plays in the East Division of the Arizona Fall League. They play their home games in Mesa, Arizona, at Sloan Park, which is also the spring training facility of the Chicago Cubs. The team was established in 1992 as the Sun Cities Solar Sox, and played for seven seasons under that name. The Solar Sox have won six league championships, most recently in 2021.

Notable alumni

 Skye Bolt, outfielder for the Oakland A's
Kris Bryant, third baseman for the Chicago Cubs
Drew Carpenter, former pitcher for the Toronto Blue Jays
Jermaine Dye, former outfielder for the Oakland Athletics and Chicago White Sox
 Scott Effross (born 1993), pitcher for the Chicago Cubs and New York Yankees
Sam Fuld, outfielder for the Chicago Cubs, Tampa Bay Rays, Oakland Athletics, and Minnesota Twins
L.J. Hoes, outfielder for the Houston Astros
Ryan Kalish, former outfielder for the Boston Red Sox and Chicago Cubs
Paul Konerko, former first baseman and designated hitter for the Chicago White Sox
Derrek Lee, former first baseman for the Chicago Cubs and Baltimore Orioles
Joc Pederson, outfielder for the Los Angeles Dodgers, Chicago Cubs, Atlanta Braves, and San Francisco Giants
Mike Piazza, MLB Hall of Famer and former catcher for the New York Mets and Los Angeles Dodgers
Cody Ross, former outfielder for the Arizona Diamondbacks
Josh Satin, second baseman for the New York Mets
Kyle Schwarber, outfielder for the Chicago Cubs and Washington Nationals
Josh Zeid, pitcher for the Houston Astros

Roster

See also
 Arizona Fall League#Results by season

References

External links

Arizona Fall League teams
Sports in Mesa, Arizona
Professional baseball teams in Arizona
1992 establishments in Arizona
Baseball teams established in 1992